The 1915 Delaware Fightin' Blue Hens football team was an American football team that represented Delaware College (later renamed the University of Delaware) as an independent during the 1915 college football season. In its eighth season under head coach William McAvoy, the team compiled a 6–3 record and outscored opponents by a total of 183 to 139. Victor H. Handy was the team captain. The team played its home games at Frazer Field in Newark, Delaware.

Schedule

References

Delaware
Delaware Fightin' Blue Hens football seasons
Delaware Fightin' Blue Hens football